This is a list of satellites owned and operated by the National Oceanic and Atmospheric Administration (NOAA), as well as planned, failed, and canceled launches.

References

Lists of satellites
Satellites
Satellites of the United States